Taxiarchis is a village and a community of the Grevena municipality. Before the 2011 local government reform it was a part of the municipality of Irakleotes, of which it was a municipal district. The 2011 census recorded 256 residents in the village. The community of Taxiarchis covers an area of 22.83 km2.

See also
 List of settlements in the Grevena regional unit

References

Populated places in Grevena (regional unit)